Arkar is a Burmese  film director and screenwriter. He gained success as a director in the early days of his career by directing the film Mystery of Burma: Beyond The Dotehtawady, which was officially released on May 4, 2018, at cinemas around Myanmar and 12 September 2018 at Singapore. His film Mystery of Burma: Beyond The Dotehtawady was nominated for Myanmar Academy Award 2018.

He is also best known for directing the short film Unbreakable Bond . The film was shot on smartphone and screened on January 19, 2020 at the JCGV Kanthaya Cinema.

Filmography

References

1993 births
Living people
Burmese film directors